Climax is 2013 Indian Malayalam biographical film directed by Anil Kumar and featuring Sana Khan in the lead role. Climax depicts the life of the actress Silk Smitha. The film was dubbed into Tamil titled "Oru Nadigayin Diary" and released on 24 May 2013 and into Telugu under the name "Gajjala Gurram". But the disclaimer in the beginning states that the characters are imaginary.

Premise
Supriya is a starlet, meets R. K., who wins her heart and later becomes her mentor, while R. K.'s son Rahul is infatuated by Supriya.

Cast

 Sana Khan as Poonkodi/Supriya
 Suresh Krishna as Ramkumar (R. K.)
 Subin Sunny as Rahul
 Shanthi Williams as Supriya's mother
 Lakshmi Sharma as Aparna
 Bijukuttan as Kumaresan
 K. Madhu as Director
 Irshad as Victor Lenus
 Manoj Nair as Hotel Manager
 Aravind Akash
 Ashwanth Thilak

Reception
The film opened to negative reviews. Paresh C Palicha of Rediff.com writes "Climax is slow paced and uninteresting" and goes on to give 1/5.

Soundtrack
The Music Was Composed By Berny-Ignatius.

See also 
 The Dirty Picture
 Dirty Picture: Silk Sakkath Maga

References

External links 
 

2010s Malayalam-language films
Indian biographical films
Films scored by Berny–Ignatius
Films about actors
2010s biographical films